The 2021 Dow Tennis Classic was a professional tennis tournament played on indoor hard courts. It was the twenty-seventh edition of the tournament which was part of the 2021 WTA 125 tournaments. It took place at the Greater Midland Tennis Center in Midland, Michigan, United States between 1 and 7 November 2021.

Singles main-draw entrants

Seeds

 1 Rankings are as of 25 October 2021.

Other entrants
The following players received wildcards into the singles main draw:
  Reese Brantmeier
  Elvina Kalieva
  Ashlyn Krueger
  Katrina Scott

The following players received entry using protected rankings:
  Han Na-lae
  Lu Jiajing

The following players received entry from the qualifying draw:
  Ellie Douglas
  Alexa Glatch
  Catherine Harrison
  Dalayna Hewitt

Withdrawals
Before the tournament
  Amanda Anisimova → replaced by  Robin Anderson
  Lauren Davis → replaced by  Marcela Zacarías
  Olga Govortsova → replaced by  Asia Muhammad
  Valentini Grammatikopoulou → replaced by  Tatjana Maria
  Priscilla Hon → replaced by  Francesca Di Lorenzo
  Nao Hibino → replaced by  Conny Perrin
  Ann Li → replaced by  Whitney Osuigwe
  Claire Liu → replaced by  Alycia Parks
  CoCo Vandeweghe → replaced by  Han Na-lae

Doubles main-draw entrants

Seeds

 Rankings are as of October 25, 2021

Champions

Singles

 Madison Brengle def.  Robin Anderson 6–2, 6–4

Doubles

 Harriet Dart /  Asia Muhammad def.  Peangtarn Plipuech /  Aldila Sutjiadi 6–3, 2–6, [10–7]

References

External links
 2021 Dow Tennis Classic at WTAtennis.com
 Official website

2021 WTA 125 tournaments
2021 in American tennis
November 2021 sports events in the United States
2021 in sports in Michigan